Gilbert Lely (1904–1985) was a French poet.

1904 births
1985 deaths
Surrealist poets
20th-century French poets
French male poets
20th-century French male writers